Thomas Jäger (born 27 October 1976) is a German professional racing driver.

Career
Born in Chemnitz, Jäger competed in the Renault Spider Trophy in 1997. He began competing in the German Formula Three Championship in 1998, where he finished third behind Christijan Albers and Marcel Fässler in 1999.

Jäger then raced in the DTM for Mercedes-Benz between 2000 and 2003. He took two podiums and a best championship finish of seventh, in 2001. Jäger was signed by Hotfiel Sport for their World Touring Car Championship campaign in 2005, although Jäger left after four rounds.

Jäger won the German Mini Challenge in 2006, and moved to the Porsche Carrera Cup Germany in 2007, which he won in 2009.

In 2010 he began working as coordinator for AMG Customer Sports.

Jäger won the 2013 Liqui Moly Bathurst 12 Hour at the Mount Panorama Circuit in Australia driving a Mercedes-Benz SLS AMG GT3 for Australian team Erebus Motorsport alongside fellow Germans Alexander Roloff and Bernd Schneider. He returned to "The Mountain" for the 2014 race where he finished 2nd in a SLS AMG GT3 alongside Maximilian Buhk and Harold Primat. After missing the 2015 race, he returned in 2016 to again link with Erebus and again in a Mercedes SLS AMG finished in 5th place driving with Nico Bastian and Australian driver David Reynolds.

Racing record

Complete Deutsche Tourenwagen Masters results
(key) (Races in bold indicate pole position) (Races in italics indicate fastest lap)

† — Retired, but was classified as he completed 90% of the winner's race distance.

Complete World Touring Car Championship results
(key) (Races in bold indicate pole position) (Races in italics indicate fastest lap)

Complete GT1 World Championship results

Complete Bathurst 12 Hour results

References

External links
 
 

1976 births
Living people
German racing drivers
German Formula Three Championship drivers
Deutsche Tourenwagen Masters drivers
World Touring Car Championship drivers
FIA GT1 World Championship drivers
Porsche Supercup drivers
Blancpain Endurance Series drivers
ADAC GT Masters drivers
24 Hours of Spa drivers
Sportspeople from Chemnitz
International GT Open drivers
24 Hours of Daytona drivers
24H Series drivers
Mercedes-AMG Motorsport drivers
HWA Team drivers
Walter Lechner Racing drivers
Rowe Racing drivers
Strakka Racing drivers
Graff Racing drivers
Nürburgring 24 Hours drivers
Porsche Carrera Cup Germany drivers